The Emblem of Bihar is the official logo of the government of the Indian state of Bihar.

Design 

The emblem of Bihar  depicts the Bodhi Tree with Prayer beads, flanked by two swastikas.

Historical emblems

Government banner
The Government of Bihar can be represented by a banner displaying the emblem of the state on a white field.

See also
 National Emblem of India
 List of Indian state emblems

References

External links
 Government of Bihar

Government of Bihar
Bihar
Bihar
Symbols of Bihar